Nechan Karakéhéyan, I.C.P.B. (17 April 1932 – 15 February 2021) was an Armenian Catholic archbishop, ordinary of Eastern Europe for Armenian Catholics (2005-2010), Armenian Catholic bishop of Isfahan (2001-2003) and Armenian Catholic ordinary of Greece for Armenian Catholics (1991-2000), titular archbishop of Adana degli Armeni.

Life

Nechan Karakéhéyan joined the Congregation of the Patriarchal Congregation of Bzommar Institute and received on 2 July 1960 his ordination to the priesthood. Pope John Paul II appointed him in 1991 Ordinary to the Armenian Catholics in Greece. On 27 September 2000 he was appointed Bishop of Isfahan.

The Patriarch of Cilicia Nerses Bedros XIX, ordained him on 28 January next year to episcopate, being his co-consecrators Gregory Ghabroyan, Bishop of the Armenian Catholic Eparchy of Sainte-Croix-de-Paris and Manuel Batakian, bishop of the Armenian Catholic Eparchy of Our Lady of Nareg in the United States of America and Canada.

On 7 January 2003 Karakéhéyan was appointed Apostolic Administrator to Greece. On 2 April 2005 he was appointed Ordinary to Eastern Europe and Titular Archbishop of Adana degli Armeni. On 6 January 2010 Pope Benedict XVI accepted his age-related withdrawal.

As a bishop-emeritus he lived at the Armenian Catholic mission in Yerevan, where he died on 15 February 2021.

References

External links
 Archbishop Nechan Karakéhéyan [Catholic-Hierarchy]
 Apostolic Administrator

1932 births
2021 deaths
Members of the Patriarchal Congregation of Bzommar
Armenian Catholic archbishops
Greek people of Armenian descent
People from Piraeus